Synapson are a French electro, nu disco and deep house duo of DJs/record producers. It was formed in 2009 with the French multi-instrumentalists Alexandre Chiere (keyboard, saxophone, beat and vocals) and Paul Cucuron (drums, scratch, record production and mixing). Singer Anna Hercot occasionally participates on some of their sets. They released their maxi Haute Couture in 2010 followed by album Stendhal Syndrome resulting in the single "Sentimental Affair". Their album Convergence with world music, hip hop, house-funk and pop influences charted both in France and Belgium.

They are best known for their remake of Burkinabé singer-songwriter and musician Victor Démé's song "Djôn'maya", renamed "Djon maya maï" and credited to Synapson featuring Victor Démé. The single charted in France and Belgium, reaching number 12 on the SNEP French Singles Chart. The duo had similar success with "All in You" featuring Anna Kova making it to number 10 on the French charts. Both hits are included in Synapson's album Convergence.

Discography

Albums

EPs

Singles

References

External links
Facebook

French DJs
French musical duos
Musical groups from Paris